The Bowie Race Track was a horse racing track located just outside the city limits of Bowie, Maryland. The one mile oval racetrack, known as Prince George's Park, was opened October 1, 1914 under the auspices of the Southern Maryland Agricultural Society—in actuality the track's owners were famous Baltimore confidence men Gad Brian and Jim O'Hara. A major attraction in the area, easy access for racetrack patrons was available from the WB&A Railroad which ran trains every five minutes from the Liberty Street Station in Baltimore for which they charged 65¢ for a round-trip ticket. Admission to the grounds and grandstand was $1.00.

The track was a natural addition to the area, home to the Belair Stud Farm, founded by Samuel Ogle and credited as the "Cradle of American thoroughbred racing."

In the 1950s, Bowie Race Track was a pioneer of winter racing. Some of the races inaugurated at the Bowie track include:
Barbara Fritchie Handicap
Caesar's Wish Stakes
Endurance Handicap
John B. Campbell Memorial Handicap
Native Dancer Stakes
Rowe Memorial Handicap

News events
Following America's involvement in World War II, the racetrack was closed from 1943 into 1945.

On March 9, 1955, officials discovered a cabin cruiser floating on the track's infield lake. No one knew how it got there.

During the night of January 31, 1966 a fire burned down five barns at the track that took the lives of at least 43 horses.

End of racing

Competition from new racing operations such as Keystone Race Track (later known as Philadelphia Park and then Parx Racing) in Bensalem, Pennsylvania ultimately led to the demise of the Bowie Race Track which ceased racing operations on July 14, 1985. The track now serves as a training center for Thoroughbred racehorses. The track and training facility is now owned by MI Developments Inc. (MID).

References

External links
Article about winter racing at Bowie Racetrack and the "Bowie Breed"

Bowie Race Track
Buildings and structures in Bowie, Maryland
Defunct horse racing venues in the United States
Stronach Group
Horse racing venues in Maryland
1914 establishments in Maryland